The 2012 UK Open Qualifier 2 was the second of eight 2012 UK Open Darts Qualifiers which was held at the K2 Centre in Crawley on Sunday 12 February.

Prize money

Draw

References

2